Catherine Adams (or similar) may refer to:

Actors
Kathryn Adams (actress, born 1893) (1893–1959), American silent-film actress
Kathryn Adams (actress, born 1920) (1920–2016), American actress; later name Kathryn Adams Doty
Katie Adams, American voice actress for 1990s and 2000s Weiß Kreuz#Civilians

Political figures
Katherine Patricia Irene Adams (born 1947), Scottish peer and MP; a/k/a Irene Adams
Cathie Adams (born 1950), American conservative political activist from Texas

Sportspeople
Kathryn Adams, American figure skater; gold medalist at 1984 St. Ivel International#Ladies
Kate Adams, Scottish winner of Women's Singles at 1993 World Indoor Bowls Championship
Katrina Adams (born 1968), American tennis player

Others
Katherine Langhorne Adams (1885–1977), American painter and printmaker
Katherine L. Adams (born 1964), American attorney at Apple Inc; a/k/a Kate Adams
Cathy Adams, British legal counselor (List of witnesses of the Iraq Inquiry#June 2010)
Cat Adams, pen name, since 1997, of American fantasy authors C.T. Adams and Cathy Clamp

Characters
Katherine Adams a/k/a Kay Adams-Corleone, portrayed by Diane Keaton in 1972 film The Godfather

See also
Adams (surname)